Grünsee (literally "Green Lake") may refer to:

Grünsee (Berchtesgadener Land), in Bavaria, Germany
Grünsee (Pflersch), in South Tyrol, Italy
Grünsee (Zermatt), in Valais, Switzerland

See also
Grüner See (disambiguation)
Green Lake (disambiguation)